Taridalu is a village in the southern state of Karnataka, India. It is located in the Gauribidanur taluk of Chikkaballapura district in Karnataka. It is situated 27 km away from sub-district headquarter Gauribidanur and 38 km away from district headquarter Chikkaballapura.

Demographics
According to Census 2011 information the location code or village code of Taridalu village is 623363.  Taridalu village is also a gram panchayat. Villages comes under Taridalu gram Panchayat are Veerammanahalli, Taridalu, Somashattyhalli, Nachakunte and Dyavasandra.

The total geographical area of village is 597.93 hectares. Taridalu has a total population of 1,718 peoples with 873 males and 845 females. There are about 442 houses in Taridalu village. Gauribidanur is nearest town to Taridalu which is approximately 27 km away.

Economy
People belonging to the Taridalu village grow very much maize, millet silk, areca nuts, Ragi, marygold, pumpkins, tuberose etc. The major occupations of the residents of Taridalu are dairy farming. The dairy cooperative is the largest individual milk supplying cooperative in the state.

Facilities
Taridalu has below types of facilities.

 Government higher primary School
 Taridalu KMF (Karnataka Milk Federation) Dairy
 Taridalu Gram Panchayat Office
 Post Office
 Gram Panchayat Library

Temples 
 Shanimahathma Swamy Temple
 Ganesha temple
 Anjenayya Temple
 Chowdeshwari Amma Temple
 Kannika Parameswari Amma Temple
 Eshwara swamy  Temple
 Basavanna Temple
 Ayyappa swamy Temple
 Maramma Thayi Temple

References

External links
 https://chikkaballapur.nic.in/en/

Villages in Chikkaballapur district